During the 2001–02 English football season, Norwich City F.C. competed in the Football League First Division.

Season summary
Despite losing 4–0 to Millwall on the opening day of the season, 2001–02 was a successful one for Norwich City. The Canaries never dropped out of the top 10 in Division One following their opening result and sneaked into the playoff places on the last day, following a 2–0 win over Stockport County. Their FA Cup run was halted at the third round after losing 4–0 to Chelsea after a replay. The game featured a memorable backheeled goal by Chelsea's Italian forward Gianfranco Zola. Norwich's League Cup run was equally disappointing, losing 1–0 away to Brentford away in the first round. Norwich faced Wolverhampton Wanderers in the First Division playoff semi final, defeating them 3–2 on aggregate, setting up a tie with Birmingham City in the final. The Canaries were eventually defeated on penalties at the Millennium Stadium in Cardiff after Iwan Roberts had opened the scoring for Norwich in extra time, following a goalless 90 minutes.

Final league table

Results
All results referenced from statto.com

Football League First Division

Play-offs

FA Cup

League Cup

Players

First-team squad
Squad at end of season

Left club during season

Reserve squad

Notes

References

Norwich City F.C. seasons
Norwich City